Conus hilli is a species of sea snail, a marine gastropod mollusk in the family Conidae, the cone snails, cone shells or cones.

These snails are predatory and venomous. They are capable of "stinging" humans.

Description
The size of the shell attains 21 mm.

Distribution
This marine species occurs in the Caribbean Sea off Panama and Guadeloupe.

References

Conidae offshore de Guadeloupe : Description du matériel dragué lors de l’expédition KARUBENTHOS 2 contenant de nouvelles espèces. Xenophora Taxonomy 24: 3-31
 Tucker J.K. & Tenorio M.J. (2013) Illustrated catalog of the living cone shells. 517 pp. Wellington, Florida: MdM Publishing

External links
 To World Register of Marine Species
 Cone Shells - Knights of the Sea
 Gastropods.com: Magelliconus magellanicus var. hilli
  Edward J. Petuch, A new molluscan faunule from the Caribbean coast of Panama; The Nautilus vol. 004:2 page 68 (1990)
 Puillandre N., Duda T.F., Meyer C., Olivera B.M. & Bouchet P. (2015). One, four or 100 genera? A new classification of the cone snails. Journal of Molluscan Studies. 81: 1-23

hilli
Gastropods described in 1990